
Gmina Bobrowniki is a rural gmina (administrative district) in Lipno County, Kuyavian-Pomeranian Voivodeship, in north-central Poland.

Villages
Gmina Bobrowniki contains the villages and settlements of Białe Błota, Białe Błota-Dębowiec, Bobrownickie Pole, Bobrowniki, Bógpomóż Nowy, Brzustowa, Gnojno, Oparczyska, Polichnowo, Polichnowo-Piaski, Rachcin, Rachcin-Okrągła, Rachcin-Parcele Łochockie, Rachcinek, Stara Rzeczna, Stare Rybitwy, Stare Rybitwy-Miszek, Stary Bógpomóż and Winduga.

Neighbouring gminas
Gmina Bobrowniki is bordered by the towns of Nieszawa and Włocławek, and by the gminas of Czernikowo, Fabianki, Lipno, Lubanie and Waganiec.

References
Polish official population figures 2006

Bobrowniki
Gmina Bobrowniki